Altona is a settlement on the island of Saint Thomas in the United States Virgin Islands. It is located on the south coast, to the west of the capital, Charlotte Amalie and the settlement of Frenchtown.

Populated places in Saint Thomas, U.S. Virgin Islands